Aberdeen Lifeboat Station is a Royal National Lifeboat Institution (RNLI) marine-rescue facility in Aberdeen, Scotland, United Kingdom. Aberdeen was one of the first lifeboat stations to be established in Scotland, it was founded in 1802. 

The station is currently equipped with a  lifeboat, the Bon Accord and a  inshore lifeboat, the James Bissett Simpson.

Fleet

No. 1 Station - All Weather Boats

No. 2 Station - All Weather Boats (Beach/Surf)

Inshore lifeboats

References

External links

Aberdeen Lifeboat Station

Lifeboat stations in Scotland
Aberdeen